Neshaminy Falls is an unincorporated community in Bensalem Township in Bucks County, Pennsylvania, United States. Neshaminy Falls is located in the northwestern part of the township, southwest of Bristol Road. It is served by the Neshaminy Falls station on SEPTA's West Trenton Line.

The community derives its name from Neshaminy Creek, a Native American name purported to mean "double stream".

References

External links

Unincorporated communities in Bucks County, Pennsylvania
Unincorporated communities in Pennsylvania